This is a list of electoral results for the electoral district of Syndal in Victorian state elections.

Members for Syndal

Election results

Elections in the 1980s

Elections in the 1970s

Elections in the 1960s

References

Victoria (Australia) state electoral results by district